Bolivar is a city and county seat of Polk County, Missouri, United States.  As of a 2019 estimate by the U. S. Census Bureau, the city population was 11,067.

History
Bolivar began as a settlement around Keeling Spring, with the majority of settlers being from Hardeman County, Tennessee. The settlement became part of Greene County, Missouri when that county was organized in 1833. After the northern part of Greene County was ceded to form Polk County, Missouri, the Polk County Court proclaimed the settlement as a city, named it Bolivar, and designated it as the county seat on 10 November 1835. Bolivar was re-organized as a fourth-class city on 15 February 1881.

Bolivar experienced growth in 1884 when the St. Louis–San Francisco Railway was extended to that point.

The name "Bolivar" was proposed by John Polk Campbell and his brothers William St. Clair and Ezekiel Madison. It is named after Bolivar, Tennessee, where their grandfather and Continental Army Colonel Ezekiel Polk had lived. In the 1830s, both Polk and Bolivar were names locally associated with liberation. As such, Bolivar, Missouri is an indirect namesake of Simón Bolívar.

The Bolivar Public Library, First National Bank, and North Ward School are listed on the National Register of Historic Places.

Geography 
Bolivar is located in Marion Township.

Climate

Demographics 

Bolivar is part of the Springfield, Missouri Metropolitan Statistical Area.

2010 census
As of the census of 2010, there were 10,325 people, 3,970 households, and 2,342 families living in the city. The racial makeup of the city was 94.8% White, 1.5% African American, 0.5% Native American, 0.6% Asian, 0.7% from other races, and 1.8% from two or more races. Hispanic or Latino people of any race were 2.5% of the population.

There were 3,970 households, of which 29.2% had children under the age of 18 living with them, 43.3% were married couples living together, 11.6% had a female householder with no husband present, 4.0% had a male householder with no wife present, and 41.0% were non-families. 33.7% of all households were made up of individuals, and 16.2% had someone living alone who was 65 years of age or older. The average household size was 2.29 and the average family size was 2.92.

The median age in the city was 30.3 years. 21.7% of residents were under the age of 18; 20.8% were between the ages of 18 and 24; 22.1% were from 25 to 44; 17.6% were from 45 to 64; and 17.7% were 65 years of age or older. The gender makeup of the city was 46.5% male and 53.5% female.

2000 census
As of the census of 2000, there were 9,143 people, 3,318 households, and 2,067 families living in the city. The population density was 1,458.8 people per square mile (563.0/km). There were 3,636 housing units at an average density of 580.1 per square mile (223.9/km). The racial makeup of the city was 96.50% White, 0.86% African American, 0.60% Native American, 0.38% Asian, 0.04% Pacific Islander, 0.42% from other races, and 1.19% from two or more races. Hispanic or Latino people of any race were 1.40% of the population.

There were 3,318 households, out of which 29.0% had children under the age of 18 living with them, 48.8% were married couples living together, 10.8% had a female householder with no husband present, and 37.7% were non-families. 30.2% of all households were made up of individuals, and 15.0% had someone living alone who was 65 years of age or older. The average household size was 2.34 and the average family size was 2.89.

In the city, the population was spread out, with 20.8% under the age of 18, 23.9% from 18 to 24, 22.1% from 25 to 44, 14.7% from 45 to 64, and 18.6% who were 65 years of age or older. The median age was 29 years. For every 100 females, there were 83.6 males. For every 100 females age 18 and over, there were 78.7 males.

The median income for a household in the city was $24,609, and the median income for a family was $35,716. Males had a median income of $25,731 versus $18,618 for females. The per capita income for the city was $13,654. About 11.0% of families and 19.8% of the population were below the poverty line, including 22.5% of those under age 18 and 11.7% of those age 65 or over.

Education
Bolivar R-I School District operates one primary school, one intermediate school, one middle school, and Bolivar High School.

Southwest Baptist University, a private institution, has been in operation at Bolivar since 1879.

Bolivar has a public library, a branch of the Polk County Library.

Transportation 
The Bolivar Municipal Airport is located four nautical miles (4.6 mi, 7.4 km) east of Bolivar's central business district.

Media

Newspapers
 Bolivar Herald-Free Press - twice weekly, Wednesday and Saturday

Gallery

Notable people
John Blake, Irish-American soldier, freedom fighter, and lecturer
Mike Parson, Lt. Governor of Missouri (2017–2018), and Governor (2018–)

References

External links
 
Bolivar Area Chamber of Commerce
 Historic maps of Bolivar in the Sanborn Maps of Missouri Collection at the University of Missouri

Cities in Missouri
Cities in Polk County, Missouri
County seats in Missouri
Springfield metropolitan area, Missouri